Nikolai Aleksandrovich Lukashenko (born 31 August 2004) is the third son of Alexander Lukashenko, president of Belarus.

Early life, family and education

There has been no official commentary regarding the identity of Nikolai's mother. Alexander Lukashenko remains formally married to his wife Galina Lukashenko, although the couple have not lived together or been seen together for the past three decades.

Nikolai has two half-brothers on his father Alexander's side and one (presumed) half-brother on his mother's side, Dzmitry Jauhienavicz Abielski. In a 2016 interview, Irina seemed to implicitly refer to Nikolai when asked whether she would like her "youngest son" to become a doctor as she comes from a family of doctors, her reply was that she would like him to "get a good education, choose an interesting profession, love his job, enjoy it and bring benefit and joy to others."

In 2011, Nikolai Lukashenko entered Ostroshitsko-Gorodok Secondary School. In 2020, he entered Belarusian State University Lyceum. Later in August 2020, Nikolai Lukashenko was reported to have withdrawn from the Lyceum, being transferred to a gymnasium in Moscow State University.

Public life

Lukashenko appeared in public for the first time in 2008. He has attracted significant media attention as his father, President Alexander Lukashenko, has frequently taken him to official ceremonies and state visits, including meetings with Venezuelan president Hugo Chávez, Russia's president Dmitry Medvedev, Pope Benedict XVI, and US president Barack Obama. According to his father, this was at Nikolai's insistence, but it has been speculated that Nikolai was being groomed to be president after Alexander. He attracted further media attention in 2013, when Alexander stated that his son would become a President of Belarus, causing numerous speculations in the press. In 2015, Lukashenko, at the age of 10, took part in a session of the United Nations General Assembly. In June 2020, he and his father attended the Moscow Victory Day Parade on Red Square.

Personal life 
Lukashenko speaks Russian and English, and is also learning Chinese and Spanish. He has been taking piano lessons since he was 9.

References

External links

Living people
2004 births
Children of national leaders
People from Minsk
21st-century Belarusian people
Nikolai